Friedrich Horschelt may refer to:

 Friedrich Horschelt (dancer) (1793–1876), German ballet master and impresario
 Friedrich Horschelt (painter) (1824–1881), German portrait painter